Peter Arne (born Peter Randolph Michael Albrecht; 29 September 19241 August 1983) was a British character actor. He made more than 50 film appearances including roles in Ice Cold in Alex, The Moonraker, Conspiracy of Hearts and Victor/Victoria. In a career that spanned 40 years he also appeared on stage and had supporting roles in the television series The Avengers, Danger Man, as well as villains in several of the Blake Edwards' Pink Panther series of films.

In August 1983, Arne was murdered. His body was found, beaten to death, inside his Knightsbridge flat.

Career
Arne was born in Kuala Lumpur, British Malaya, to a Swiss-French mother and an American father, and gained his early acting experience in British provincial repertory. In 1953, the New Lindsey Theatre Club performed his play No Stranger.

From the mid-1950s onwards, he developed a successful career playing a broad range of supporting roles in both film and television often with a specialisation in playing unsmiling villains and German officers. In addition to acting, he ran his own antiques business.

In 1968, he played the roles of the prisoner known as the Duke, as well as Dr. Sanson Carrasco, in the London stage production of Man of La Mancha. (The two roles were played by John Castle in the 1972 film version of the musical.)

In the 1960s and 1970s, Arne was a busy character actor on television. He appeared in several ITC adventure series and in four episodes of The Avengers as different characters each time. He was also in The Protectors in 1972. He appeared in the last two episodes of Secret Army (1979) as a German Colonel, and as a regular in series two of Triangle in 1982.

Embezzling funds from Mary Renault
In the late 1940s, Arne and his partner at the time, Jack Corke, befriended English novelist Mary Renault and her partner, Julie Mullard, on the SS Cairo, a steamer bound from Britain to South Africa.

Arne (aged 26 at the time) and Corke persuaded Mary Renault that they could get rich quickly by building housing for recent immigrants like themselves. The four of them established a company called CAM Construction, which Renault financed using a £25,000 award she'd received from the movie studio Metro-Goldwyn-Mayer, and the company began employing labourers and craftsmen to begin construction of several houses.

Arne and Corke (an alcoholic) squandered funds on high living, leaving bills unpaid, and the company failed to generate revenue. After Arne and Corke stole Renault's Studebaker, her lawyer obtained their resignations from the firm and persuaded them to leave the house the four had formerly shared. Arne and Corke then disappeared from Renault's life for good, Arne returning to Britain.

Death
On 1 August 1983, Arne attended a costume fitting in Clerkenwell intended for his character Range in the BBC Doctor Who television serial Frontios (a role which would eventually be played by William Lucas).

Shortly after Arne returned to his Knightsbridge home, neighbours reported hearing a violent argument coming from his home. Arne's body was found inside his flat, bludgeoned to death with a stool and a log from his fireplace, which was found in the communal hall.

The prime suspect in Arne's murder was a schoolteacher from Verona, Italy, who had been living rough in a local park, and for whom Arne had been providing food.

Police issued a photofit image after eyewitnesses reported seeing a young man loitering nearby eating a jar of honey. Four days later, a body matching this description was found in the River Thames at Wandsworth, having drowned in an apparent suicide. Bloodstained clothes were later found upstream at Putney. Police identified the body as that of Giuseppe Perusi, an Italian schoolteacher. Inquiries revealed Arne had been giving food to the Italian man.

An inquest at Westminster Coroner's Court in October 1983 recorded a verdict of unlawful killing for Arne and suicide for Perusi. Police concluded that Perusi had beaten the actor to death then killed himself. The reason for the violent argument remains unknown.

Filmography

Film

For Those in Peril (1944) as Junior officer (uncredited)
You Know What Sailors Are (1954) as Ahmed
The Purple Plain (1954) as Flight Lieutenant (uncredited)
The Men of Sherwood Forest (1954)
Mystery on Bird Island (1954) as Henri
Timeslip (1955) as Dr. Stephen Rayner / Jarvis
The Cockleshell Heroes (1955) as Marine Stevens
Tarzan and the Lost Safari (1957) as Dick Penrod
High Tide at Noon (1957) as Owen MacKenzie
Strangers' Meeting (1957) as Harry Belair
The Moonraker (1958) as Edmund Tyler
Ice Cold in Alex (1958) as British Officer at Oasis
Intent to Kill (1958) as Kral
Danger Within (1959) as Capitano Benucci
Scent of Mystery (1960) as Robert Fleming
Conspiracy of Hearts (1960) as Lt. Schmidt
Sands of the Desert (1960) as Sheikh El Jabez
The Hellfire Club (1961) as Thomas, Earl of Netherden
A Story of David (1961) as Doeg
The Treasure of Monte Cristo (1961) as Boldini
The Pirates of Blood River (1962) as Hench, a pirate
Girl in the Headlines (1963) as Hammond Barker
The Victors (1963) 
The Black Torment (1964) as Seymour
Khartoum (1966) as Maj. Kitchener
The Sandwich Man (1966) as Gentleman in Rolls-Royce
Battle Beneath the Earth (1967) as Arnold Kramer
Chitty Chitty Bang Bang (1968) as Captain of Bomburst
The Oblong Box (1969) as Trench
When Eight Bells Toll (1971) as Capt. Imrie
Murders in the Rue Morgue (1971) as Aubert
Straw Dogs (1971) as John Niles
Antony and Cleopatra (1972) as Menas
Nobody Ordered Love (1972) as Leo Richardstone
Pope Joan (1972) as Richard
The Return of the Pink Panther (1975) as Colonel Sharki
Providence (1977) as Nils
Agatha (1979) as Hotel Manager
The Passage (1979) as Guide
Victor Victoria (1982) as Labisse
Trail of the Pink Panther (1982) as Col. Bufoni
Curse of the Pink Panther (1983) as General Bufoni
Tangiers (1982) as Malen (final film role)

Television
The Avengers (1961–1966) as Pasold / Redfern / Cosmo Gallion / Kolchek
Danger Man (1964–1965) as General G'Niore / Chi Ling / John Richardson
The Saint (1964) as Pablo Enriquez
The Mask of Janus (1965) as Copic
Hereward the Wake (1965) as Harold Godwinson
The Spies (1966) as Copic
The Baron (1967) as Mario Navini
Man in a Suitcase (1968) as Rudnik
The Champions (1968) as Margoli
Department S (1970) as Slovic / Segres
Special Branch (1970) as Anatoli Golovin
Softly, Softly (1972) as Billy Baxter
The Stallion (1972)
Quiller (1975) as Neumann
Secret Army (1979) as Colonel von Schalk
To Serve Them All My Days (1981) as Dr. Farrington / Doctor Farrington
Triangle (1982–1983) as Kevin Warrender
Hart to Hart (1983) as Brooks Kerr
The Far Pavilions (1984) as The General

References

External links

1924 births
1983 deaths
1983 murders in the United Kingdom
British male film actors
British murder victims
British people of Swiss descent
British people of American descent
British male television actors
Deaths by beating in the United Kingdom
People murdered in London
People from Kuala Lumpur
English gay actors
20th-century British male actors
20th-century British LGBT people
1980s murders in London